Diastella fraterna, commonly known as the palmiet silkypuff,  is a plant of the family Proteaceae native to South Africa.

References

fraterna
Plants described in 1976
Flora of South Africa